Gardenia erubescens is a shrub or small tree species with edible fruits that occurs in the Guinea and Sudan savannah vegetation of West and Central Africa. It is within the Rubiaceae family.

Description 
A shrub or small tree, the species grows to 3 meters in height. Leaves are opposite, grows on the end of short branches and grouped in tufts, when dry, the foliage have a purple greyish color on the upper surface which becomes a little duller beneath, both sides are glabrous. Stipules are 2–4 mm long, leaf-blade is broadly obovate.  Inflorescence; flowers are solitary or in small clusters, calyx is tubular consisting of 6 linear lobes, corolla, also is in a tubular form, consisting of about 6 elliptic lobes. Fruit has an ellipsoid or ovoid shape, it is yellowish in color when ripe, about 3–8 cm long.

Distribution 
Commonly occurs in woodland savannas in West African countries of Senegal, Nigeria, and eastwards towards Central Africa.

Chemistry 
Test on plant extracts identified the presence of the compounds beta-sitosterol, oleanolic acid, ursolic acid and a group of methylated flavonoids that includes 5-hydroxy-7,4'-dimethoxyflavone and triterpenoids.

Uses 
In parts of Northern Nigeria, a decoction of the species is used to treat a variety of health issues including gonorrhea, ascites and loss of appetite, extracts are also used as an aphrodisiac and stimulant. Its edible fruit are consumed by locals.

References 

Flora of West Tropical Africa
erubescens